Berastagi, is a town and district of Karo Regency situated on a crossroads on the main route linking the Karo highlands of Northern Sumatra to the coastal city of Medan. The village rose to significance when Dutch settlers in Sumatra opened a boarding school there in the 1920s.

The weather can be fair and sunny during the day but may become foggy around dusk to night.

The main economic activities in Berastagi centers on the colorful fruit and vegetable market, as well as tourism. 
Berastagi is famous for its passion fruit.
The main attractions of the town are the two active volcanoes; Mount Sibayak, with its hot springs, and Mount Sinabung. Each mountain can be climbed in one day, but a guide is needed.

The town is also a stop on the way to Lake Toba. The dominant ethnic and linguistic group is Karo Batak.

An airport bus from Kabanjahe directly to the new Kuala Namu International Airport v.v. is available.

Administration

Villages

The small towns of Barusjahe and Tigapanah are located to the east of Berastagi, while Simpang Empat, is located to the west, Deli Serdang Regency to the north and Kabanjahe to the south of Berastagi.

There are 9 villages, called desa, in the Berastagi district. It is the smallest, but most densely populated (1,582 persons/square kilometre in 2020) district of Karo Regency.

Desas with population (2007):
Gurusinga, 3,900
Raya, 4,358
Rumah Berastagi, 6,611
Tambak Lau Mulgap I, 2,677
Tambak Lau Mulgap II, 3,147
Gundaling I, 8,388
Gundaling II, 5130
Sempajaya, 7,115
Doulu, 2,011

Demographics 
The population of Berastagi district was 44,765 as of 2010, but increased to 48,244 in 2020. It is the second-most populous district in Karo Regency, after Kabanjahe.
Berastagi District has significantly more Muslims than most parts of Karo Regency, with 17,801 Muslims, 5,042 Catholics, 29,195 Protestants, 1,245 Hindus or Buddhists, and 54 others, Sempajaya has the highest percentage of Muslims among the desas, being 67% Muslim. There are 28 mosques, 29 churches, and 2 Buddhist temples in the district.

The town is ethnically diverse with many migrants from adjacent regions. Beside Karo Batak, who form the majority of the population, there is a substantial amount of Toba Batak, Javanese, and Chinese living in Berastagi.

97% of primary-age children attend school, but only 77% of high-school-age children. There are 26 primary schools, 8 intermediate schools, and 9 high schools within the district.

Economy

Agriculture
Agriculture is much less important in Berastagi (and Kabanjahe) than in the rest of Karo Regency. Crops include scallions, common beans, peas, potatoes, cauliflower, cabbage, radish, Chinese cabbage, tomatoes, carrots, and chayote. Rice is not a significant crop. Fruit grown include oranges, passionfruit, kaki and avocados. There is significantly more industry in Berastagi district than in the rest of Karo Regency, aided by Berastagi's 100% paved roads.

Tourism
Due to a close distance from Medan, Berastagi was developed initially as an upper-class hill station for the European population in the plantation district around Medan. Today, Berastagi attracts a large amount of local as well as national and international tourists. Many investors developed several tourism sites, hotels and lodges to attract visitor from Medan and elsewhere. Places of interest include 
 Miki Holiday Hotel and Funland, a hotel with an amusement park inside, located in Sempajaya village.
 Lumbini Natural Park is a Theravāda style Buddhist temple that is similar to the Shwedagon Pagoda in Myanmar, built in 2010.
 Bukit Kubu (Kubu Hill), a greeny hill area with a hotel inside suitable for picnics.
 Berastagi Fruit Market, a regionally famous traditional market selling local fruits souvenirs.
 Milk Pasteurization factory, a factory that sells local pasteurized milk. Visitors can also observe the procedure of making the product.
 Tahura, abbreviated of Taman Hutan Raya (Forest park), is a forest with various types of trees. Located near the town's entry gate.
 Kebun Madu Efi, located above 1400 masl this honey apiary provides Boutique Cabins, Camping area featuring tent rentals, flower gardens, buffet dining & a picturesque mountain and hill views.

References

the most visited tourist spot in Berastagi (Sibayaknews)

External links

 Gov. Investment Agency - Tourism
 

Towns in Karo Regency